The Impatient Maiden is a 1932 American pre-Code drama film directed by James Whale, starring Lew Ayres and Mae Clarke, and released by Universal Pictures. The screenplay was written by Richard Schayer and Winifred Dunn, based on the novel The Impatient Virgin, by Donald Henderson Clarke.

Plot

Cast
Lew Ayres as Dr. Myron Brown
Mae Clarke as Ruth Robbins
Una Merkel as Betty Merrick 
Andy Devine as Clarence Howe 
John Halliday as Albert Hartman 
Oscar Apfel as Dr. Wilcox 
Ethel Griffies as Nurse Lovett 
Helen Jerome Eddy as Mrs. Gilman 
Bert Roach as Mr. Gilman 
Cecil Cunningham as Mrs. Rosy 
Lorin Raker as Mr. Rosy
Blanche Payson as Mrs. Thomas 
Arthur Hoyt as Mr. Thomas 
Monte Montague as ambulance driver

External links
 

1932 films
1932 drama films
American drama films
American black-and-white films
Films based on American novels
Films directed by James Whale
Universal Pictures films
1930s English-language films
1930s American films
Films with screenplays by Richard Schayer